The men's pursuit competitions in biathlon of the 2011 IPC Biathlon and Cross-Country Skiing World Championships were held on April 2, 2011.

Medals

Results

Sitting 
The men's 3 km pursuit, sitting. Skiers compete on a sitski.

Qualification 
09:00 local time

Final 
15:10 local time

Standing 
The men's 3.6 km pursuit, standing.

Qualification 
09:30 local time

Final 
16:00 local time

Visually impaired 
In the men's 3.6 km pursuit, visually impaired, skiers with a visual impairment compete with a sighted guide. Dual medals are rewarded.

Qualification 
10:10 local time

Final 
16:50 local time

See also
Biathlon World Championships 2011 – Men's pursuit

References

2011 IPC Biathlon and Cross-Country Skiing World Championships Live results, and schedule at ipclive.siwidata.com
WCH - Khanty Mansiysk - Results - Biathlon Pursuit, IPC Nordic Skiing

Pursuit